860 Naval Air Squadron (860 NAS) was a Naval Air Squadron of the Royal Navy's Fleet Air Arm during World War II, which was transferred to the Royal Netherlands Navy in 1946, and remains active.

In British service
860 Squadron was formed in June 1943 at RNAS Donibristle, Scotland, from personnel of the Royal Netherlands Navy, under the command of Luitenant J. van der Tooren. As a torpedo-bomber/reconnaissance squadron, flying the Fairey Swordfish, the squadron moved to Maydown, Northern Ireland, in November 1943. In June 1945 the squadron was re-equipped with the Fairey Barracuda, and in August it was assigned to the escort carrier .

In May 1946 the squadron converted to the Fairey Firefly, and in September 1946 was handed over to Dutch control, becoming part of the Netherlands Naval Aviation Service.

In Dutch service
Assigned to the former Nairana, now renamed HNLMS Karel Doorman (QH1), it took part in operations in Java during the Indonesian War of Independence. It operated the Hawker Sea Fury from 1950 until 1956, then the Hawker Sea Hawk from 1957, while based at Valkenburg Naval Air Base, and flying from the second . Disbanded in 1964, it was reformed in October 1966 as an ASW/SAR helicopter squadron operating from Naval Air Station De Kooy and the s. Equipped with the Westland Wasp, then the Westland Lynx from 1978, in early 2008 it converted to the NHIndustries NH90, and in July that year became part of the joint military Defence Helicopter Command.

References

800 series Fleet Air Arm squadrons
Military units and formations established in 1943
Military units and formations of the Royal Navy in World War II